Sphingomonas daechungensis  is a  Gram-negative, non-spore-forming, aerobic and non-motile bacteria from the genus of Sphingomonas which has been isolated from sediments of the Daechung water reservoir in Korea.

References

Further reading

External links
Type strain of Sphingomonas daechungensis at BacDive -  the Bacterial Diversity Metadatabase

daechungensis
Bacteria described in 2014